This is a list of Portuguese television related events from 2012.

Events
1 January - João Mota wins the second series of Secret Story.
25 February - Denis Felipe wins the first series of A Voz de Portugal.
29 July - Diogo Piçarra wins the fifth series of Ídolos.
15 September - TVI's teen drama Morangos com Açúcar concludes its nine-year run.

Debuts

Television shows

2000s
Ídolos (2003-2005, 2009–present)

2010s
Secret Story (2010–present)
A Voz de Portugal (2011–present)

Ending this year
15 September: Morangos com Açúcar on TVI (2003-2012)

Births

Deaths